Mercedes Monterrey was a Spanish film actress. She appeared in twenty eight films between 1946 and 1982.

Selected filmography
 Magic Concert (1953)
 The Last Torch Song (1957)
 Melancholic Autumn (1958)
 The Sun Comes Out Every Day (1958)

References

Bibliography
 Lancia, Enrico. Amedeo Nazzari. Gremese Editore, 1983.

External links

Year of birth unknown
Year of death unknown
Spanish film actresses
People from Barcelona
20th-century Spanish actresses